Baltika Brewery is the second largest brewing company in Europe and the leader of the Russian beer market with over 38% market share. It is headquartered in St. Petersburg and part owned by the Baltic Beverages Holding.

The Baltika brand was one of the two Russian brands (together with Lukoil) included in the Financial Times Top100 Most Valuable Global Brands list in 2007. However, Baltika was not included on the list in 2009. Baltika is one of the top three brands in the Interbrand Best Global Brands 2012 report.

History

Baltika Breweries launched production in St. Petersburg in 1990. It was co-founded by Afghan-born Naif Achakzai and Nikita Kefirov. After privatization in 1992, the company was reorganized into an open joint stock company. In 1993 Baltic Beverages Holding Brewing Concern became the company's largest shareholder. In 1998, the name of the enterprise was changed to Open Joint Stock Company Baltika Breweries. 2000 saw the opening of the largest Soufflet Malting Plant in Russia built by Baltika in St. Petersburg, together with the French company "Groupe Soufflet", which invested approximately $35 million in the project and received 70% ownership of the plant. Baltika covered the rest of the expenses and received 30% of the shares.

The company listed on the Rts stock exchange in September 2001; by January 2002 it had reached a market capitalization of $1.3 billion.

At the end of 2006, Baltika merged with three Russian breweries, Vena, Pikra, and Yarpivo, and in 2007 they became one legal entity.

In April 2008, Baltic Beverages Holding bought a stake in Baltika.

Following the stake bought in Baltika by Baltic Beverages Holding, Baltika delisted from the Moscow stock exchange in October 2012.

Capacity 
Baltika's monthly production capacity is over 5.2 million litres.

Company structure 
The company employs approximately 9000 people. Baltika No. 3 is the only Russian beer produced under contract in Germany.

Owners and management

The Scandinavian brewing concern Baltic Beverages Holding continues to own Baltika through Carlsberg.

Production sites
The company has several production sites: 

 Headquarters and Baltika – St Petersburg brewery
 Baltika-Baku brewery (Baku, Azerbaijan)
 Baltika-Voronezh brewery
 Baltika-Novosibirsk brewery
 Baltika-Rostov brewery
 Baltika-Samara brewery
 Baltika-Tula brewery
 Baltika-Khabarovsk brewery
 Baltika-Yaroslavl brewery

See also

Beer in Russia

References

External links
Official website 
Official English website
 Baltika's Australian Distributor
 Baltika's Korean Distributor 
 Baltika brewery on Beer Advocate

Beer in Russia
Drink companies of the Soviet Union
Manufacturing companies based in Saint Petersburg
Russian brands
Drink companies of Russia
Companies formerly listed on the Moscow Exchange